Thomas Bruce McNevin (6 February 1884 – 2 March 1951) was a Liberal party member of the House of Commons of Canada. He was born in Ops Township, Ontario and became a farmer by career.

McNevin attended public and continuation schools in Victoria County, Ontario. In Lindsay, he became president of the Farmers Union Insurance Company.

He was first elected to Parliament at the Victoria, Ontario riding in the 1935 general election after an unsuccessful campaign there as a Progressive party candidate in 1925. He was re-elected in 1940 then defeated by Clayton Hodgson of the Progressive Conservatives in 1945. McNevin was also unsuccessful in unseating Hodgson in 1949.

McNevin died at Omemee, Ontario on 2 March 1951 survived by his wife (Edith Dundas) and two daughters.

References

External links
 

1884 births
1951 deaths
Canadian farmers
Liberal Party of Canada MPs
Members of the House of Commons of Canada from Ontario
People from Kawartha Lakes